Pierfelice (Pedro Félix, Pierre Félice) Ravenna (born 1938) is a Chilean botanist of Italian Jewish origin. His research interests are mainly in the field of South American Amaryllidaceae.

Selected publications 
 1970a. Nuevas especies de Amaryllidaceae. Notic. Mens. Mus. Nac. Hist. Nat. Santiago 269 : 1-7
 1970b. Contributions to South American Amaryllidaceae III. Pl. Life 37: 73–103, figs. 18-25
 
 1972. Latin American Amaryllidis 1971. Pl. Life 28: 119–127, figs. 28-30
 1974. Contributions to South American Amaryllidaceae VI. Pl. Life 30: 29-79
 1978. Studies in the Alliaceae‑II (error tip. "Alliae”). Pl. Life 34 (2): 3-10
 
 1983. Catila and Onira, two new genera of South American Iridaceae. Nordic Journal of Botany 3 ( 2): 197-205
 1988. New species of South American Habranthus and Zephyranthes (Amaryllidaceae). Onira 1 (8): 53-56
 2000a. New or noteworthy Leucocoryne species (Alliaceae). Onira 4 (2): 3-10
 2000b. The family Gilliesiaceae. Onira 4 (3): 11-14 (with key to genera)
 2000c. Miersia scalae, a synonym of Gilliesia monophylla (Gilliesaceae). Onira 4 (8):30
 
 2003b. Los subgéneros de Leucocoryne y la ilegitimidad de Pabellonia (Alliaceae). Chloris Chilensis 6 ( 2)
 2005a. Gilliesia dimera and Gilliesia isopetala two new species from central Chile (Gilliesiaceae). Onira 9 (17): 60-63
 2005b.  Solaria brevicoalita and S. curacavina two Chilean species of Gilliesiaceae. Onira 9 (16): 64-67
 2005c. On the absence of the genus Gilliesia (Gilliesiaceae) in the Argentine flora. Onira 9 (15): 59
 2005d. Especies nuevas de Gilliesia y Solaria (Gilliesiaceae) y claves para el reconocimiento de las especies de ambos géneros''. Chloris Chilensis 8 ( 1)

Awards 

Awarded The Herbert Medal in 1974

Legacy 

The International Plant Names Index lists 1,741 taxa for which Ravenna is the botanical authority.

References

Bibliography 

20th-century Chilean botanists
Chilean Jews
1938 births
Living people
Chilean people of Italian-Jewish descent
21st-century Chilean botanists